Agyneta depigmentata is a species of sheet weaver found in the Azores. It was described by Wunderlich in 2008.

References

depigmentata
Spiders described in 2008
Spiders of Europe
Fauna of the Azores